DiDonato is a surname. Notable people with the surname include:

 Anthony DiDonato, a former Democratic member of the Pennsylvania House of Representatives
 Emily DiDonato, an American model
 Greg DiDonato, an American politician
 Joyce DiDonato, an American operatic mezzo-soprano
 Giacomo Di Donato,  a former Italian footballer